Ana María Picchio (born March 30, 1946 in Buenos Aires) is an Argentine actress.

She made her debut in 1969 in the film Breve cielo and has made over 50 appearances in film and TV to date. For her role in Breve cielo she won the award for Best Actress at the 6th Moscow International Film Festival. and twice the Silver Condor Award for Best Actress, in 1970 and 1987.
In 1974 she was also starring in Mario Benedetti's The Truce (1974 film),submitted to the Academy Awards (the Academy Award for Best Foreign Language Film) and won a nomination (the first Academy Award nomination in Argentine film history). The film has since gained cult status in Argentina.

She was awarded the Konex Award in 1981 and 1991. She won nine nominations and won the Martín Fierro Awards in 1990 and 2016.

Selected filmography

 Guía para muertos recientes (2022).
 Lo que nunca nos dijimos (2015).
 El espejo de los otros (2015).
 Angelita la doctora (2014).
 Cuando yo te vuelva a ver (2013).
 La cola (2011).
 Cómo se hizo el exilio de Gardel (2010).
 Nada por perder (2001).
 El mar de Lucas (1999).
 Fuga de cerebros (1998).
 Pequeños milagros (1997). 	
 Martín (Hache) (1997). 	
 Perdido por perdido (1993).
 Después de la tormenta (1991). 	
 Chechechela, una chica de barrio (1986).
 Pobre mariposa (1986).
 La mayoría silenciada, (1986).
 El exilio de Gardel (Tangos) (1985).	
 La cruz invertida (1985).
 Tacos altos (1985).
 El rigor del destino (1985). 	
 Los días de junio (1985).
 Adiós, Roberto (1985).
 El sol en botellitas (1985).	
 Asesinato en el Senado de la Nación (1984).
 Un hombre de arena (1983).
 Sentimental (Requiem para un amigo)  (1981).
 De cara al cielo (1979).
 La Raulito (1975). 	
 Los días que me diste (1975).
 The Truce (1974 film) (1974).
 Los golpes bajos (1974).
 Operación Masacre (1972). 	
 La sartén por el mango (1972).
 La pandilla inolvidable (1972). 	
 Santos Vega (1971).
 El habilitado (1970). 	
 El Santo de la espada (1970). 	
 Breve cielo (1969).

Theater 

2021/2022..........Perdidamente
2018...............   Plaza Suite 
2016 ............... Franciscus.
2013 ............... Incendies (play)
2012 ............... Hembras, un encuentro de mujeres notables
2010/2011 .......  All My Sons (Kate Keller)
2009 ............... Tango turco
2007 ............... Un día muy particular
2005/2006 ....... El pan de la locura
2001/2003 ....... Made in Lanús
1996 ............... El mágico mundo de los cuentos
1995 ............... Algo en común
1994 ............... Juana Azurduy
1992................ Pijamas 
1991 ............... Y... ¿Dónde están mis pantalones?
1989 ............... Extraña pareja
1988/1989 .......  El protagonista
1988 ............... Yo amo Carlos Paz
1987 ............... Gasalla es el Maipo y el Maipo es Gasalla
1981 ............... El último pasaje
1979 ............... Mujeres
1978 ............... Encantada de conocerlo 
1973 ............... A Doll's House
1972 ............... Mea culpa
1967 ............... Luces de bohemia
 Los prójimos

Television 

 Vis a vis: El oasis (2020) 
 El marginal (2019) 
 Solamente vos (2013) 
 Sos mi hombre (2012) 
 Condicionados (2012) 
 El hombre de tu vida (2011) 
 Enseñame a vivir (2009) 
 Mujeres asesinas (2008) 
 Mujeres de nadie (2007- 2008) 
 Mujeres asesinas (2006) 
 Amas de casa desesperadas (2006) 
 Gladiadores de Pompeya (2006) 
 Mujeres asesinas (2005) 
 Panadería "Los Felipe" (2004) 
 Los de la esquina (2004)
 Los Roldán (2004)
 Costumbres argentinas (2003) 
 Infieles (2002) 
 Los buscas de siempre (2000)
 Mamitas (1999)
 Como vos y yo (1998)
 De corazón (1997)
 Un solitario corazón (1996)
 Alta comedia (1995)
 La marca del deseo (1994)
 Son de Diez (1994)
 Con alma de tango (1994)
 Zona de riesgo (1993)
 Vendedoras de Lafayette (1988)
 Vínculos (1987)
 Ficciones (1987)
 Compromiso (1983)
 Nosotros y los miedos (1982)
 Hola Pelusa (1980)
 Andrea Celeste (1979)
 Renato (1978)
 El humor de Niní Marshall (1977)
 Tiempo de vivir (1977)
 Alguien por quien vivir (1975)
 El inglés de los güesos (1975)

References

External links

 
 He Vivido: Ana María Picchio, una actriz multifacética
 Ana María Picchio y el emotivo mensaje que le dio su nieta
 Ana María Picchio - Rotten Tomatoes

1946 births
Living people
Argentine film actresses
Argentine stage actresses
Argentine television actresses
Actresses from Buenos Aires